Cedar Butte is an unincorporated community in Mellette County, in the U.S. state of South Dakota.

History
Cedar Butte was laid out in 1910, taking its name from a local summit noted for its cedar trees. A post office called Cedarbutte was established in 1915.

References

Unincorporated communities in Mellette County, South Dakota
Unincorporated communities in South Dakota